The 2013 Owensboro Rage season was the second and final season for the Continental Indoor Football League (CIFL) franchise.

On July 13, 2012, owner and general manager Eddie Cronin died in an automobile accident. On August 8, 2012, the Rage confirmed that they would continue to be a part of the CIFL again in 2013, with Cronin's fiancé, Melissa Logsdon running the team. The season will be dedicated to Cronin. On September 27, 2012, Logsdon announced that the team would be moving to Owensboro, Kentucky. The Rage also named Kory White as General Manager the same day. The Rage signed former Louisville quarterback  Bill Ashburn as well as former Arena Football League wide receiver Robert Redd to get the team's offense going.

After starting off 2-0, the Rage lost three straight games. To help the floundering team, the Rage signed Jared Lorenzen to help solidify the quarterback position. Lorenzen helped the Rage instantly by helping the Rage win a close game with the Marion Blue Racers. The Rage received two automatic victories from the folding of the Kane County Dawgs, bringing their record to 5-3, but with two games remaining in the season, the Rage suspended operations due to lack of funds. The Rage forfeit their final two games of the season, making their record 5-5.

Roster

Schedule

Regular season

Standings

Coaching staff

References

2013 Continental Indoor Football League season
Owensboro Rage
Owensboro Rage